8,8'-Bieckol is an eckol-type phlorotannin found in the brown algae Ecklonia cava and Ecklonia kurome.

References 

Phlorotannins